SB-366791 is a drug which acts as a potent and selective blocker of the TRPV1 ion channel. It has analgesic effects in animal studies, and is used in research into pain and inflammation.

See also 
 AMG-517
 AMG-9810
 Discovery and development of TRPV1 antagonists

References 

Chloroarenes
Amides
Methoxy compounds